"Butterfly" is a popular song written by Bernie Lowe and Kal Mann and published in 1957. The song is credited to Anthony September as songwriter in some sources. This was a pseudonym of Anthony Mammarella, producer of American Bandstand.

The original recording of the song by Charlie Gracie reached No. 1 on the Billboard Juke Box chart, No. 10 on the R&B chart and No. 12 on the  UK Singles Chart in 1957.

Andy Williams recording
A cover version by Andy Williams reached No. 1 on the Billboard Top 100 chart in 1957. Williams' version also reached No. 1 the UK in May 1957, where it spent two weeks, and also reached No. 14 on the US R&B chart.

The Charlie Gracie and Andy Williams versions were ranked #20 on the first Canadian CHUM Chart, May 27, 1957.

Other versions
A version recorded by Bob Carroll on Bally Records made the charts in 1957 peaking at No. 61.  
The Crests recorded a cover version for their 1960 album, The Crests Sing All Biggies.
Tommy Steele - included on an EP Lord's Taverners Record - All Star Hit Parade No. 2 (1957).
Cliff Richard - for his album Just... Fabulous Rock 'n' Roll (2016)
Darlene Gillespie on her album Darlene of the Teens

See also
List of number-one singles from the 1950s (UK)
List of Billboard number-one singles of 1957

References

1957 songs
1957 singles
Songs written by Bernie Lowe
Songs with lyrics by Kal Mann
Andy Williams songs
Charlie Gracie songs
Number-one singles in the United States
UK Singles Chart number-one singles
Billboard Top 100 number-one singles
Cameo Records singles
Cadence Records singles